Li Erzhong (1914–2010) was a People's Republic of China politician. He was born in Hebei Province. He was governor of his home province (1980–1982). He was a delegate to the 5th National People's Congress.

References

1914 births
2010 deaths
People's Republic of China politicians from Hebei
Chinese Communist Party politicians from Hebei
Governors of Hebei
Delegates to the 5th National People's Congress
National University of Peking alumni